Roger Tapia is a Filipino para-athlete who competed in the 2012 Summer Paralympics in London.

Early life and education
Born with a speech impairment caused by a cleft lip and without his left arm. Tapia began running at age 5 due to his brother being a runner. He attended the Jose Rizal University and was part of the school's athletics team. He is a native of Pagudpud, Ilocos Norte.

Career
Tapia competed in local tournaments for Ilocos Norte winning in events against abled-bodied athletes. This includes the 2008 Palarong Pambansa, the national student-athlete games.

Tapia represented the Philippines at the 2011 ASEAN Para Games where he bagged a gold in the 400m event and two silvers in the 100m and 200m events.

He qualified for the 2012 Summer Paralympics in London through the April 2012 Malaysia Open where he clocked 23.56 seconds in the 200m race. He competed in the T46 classification.

References

 

Paralympic track and field athletes of the Philippines
Athletes (track and field) at the 2012 Summer Paralympics
Sportspeople from Ilocos Norte
Filipino amputees
Year of birth missing (living people)
Living people
Filipino male sprinters
Medalists at the 2010 Asian Para Games